The Twin Coast Discovery Highway is an  circular road route of Northland, a region located in New Zealand. Most of the route travels on part of State Highway 1 (SH 1), the longest and major road in New Zealand, but some parts spur off onto other roads. It is commonly used as a tourist route, most of the time to visit Cape Reinga. The name "Twin Coast Discovery" is so named because the route up to and back from Cape Reinga are on different coasts.

Route 

Twin Coast Discovery Highway begins in Central Auckland, on SH 1. It travels onto the Auckland Harbour Bridge and begins to travel through the North Shore of Auckland, north of the Waitemata Harbour. It begins to cross through rural farmlands, and enters an automated toll road, passing through the Johnstones Hill Tunnels. SH 1 narrows to two lanes, and continues through Puhoi. Soon, the road passes through Warkworth and Wellsford, before crossing into Northland.

The route continues on SH 1 until the road meets the town of Brynderwyn. From there, the route turns west on SH 12, passing through Maungaturoto and a few other small settlements. For , the route goes west, before entering the town Ruawai, a settlement placed directly next to the Wairoa River. From there, the road turns north, and parts of it are situated right next to the Wairoa River. The route passes through the town of Dargaville and continues north. It briefly goes through Waipoua Kauri Forest, a forest that is well known for having Tane Mahuta, the largest tree in all of New Zealand. The route reaches Ōmāpere, before turning right.

Soon, it reaches the town of Kaikohe, before the route briefly turns left onto SH 15, before turning left onto SH 1, reconnecting with the road. It passes through a few small settlements such as Okaihau, Rangiahua, Umawera, Mangamuka, before it reaches the town of Kaitaia. From there, the route continues going north, passing through several small settlements until it reaches Cape Reinga, the main tourist attraction of the route, and the very top of the North Island.

The road turns south, and reaches the town of Awanui, which the route turns east onto SH 10. It continues going east, passing through Coopers Beach, and a few other small towns. It begins to turn south, nearing the town of Kerikeri. Soon, it passes through Oramahoe, and finally reaches Pakaraka, and reconnects with SH 1. SH 1 continues going south, until it reaches Whangarei, skirting through the south-western Whangarei Harbour, and then to south of the city.

It begins to near the coast of Ruakaka, before going up the Brynderwyn Hills, and down to meet the town of Brynderwyn, soon entering into the Auckland Regional Boundary, then passing the towns of Warkworth and Wellsford. It passes through the Johnstones Hill Tunnels, and widens to 4 lanes. The road crosses through rural farmlands, before passing through the North Shore, and finally reconnecting with Central Auckland.

Major junctions

References

State Highway 1 (New Zealand)
Geography of the Northland Region